Emmett Preston Lowery Jr. (November 11, 1911 – December 19, 1975) was an American football and basketball coach. He served as the head football coach at Mankato State Teachers College—now known as Minnesota State University, Mankato—in 1935 and at River Falls State Teachers College—now known as the University of Wisconsin–River Falls–from 1936 to 1941, compiling a career college football coaching record of 28–17–4.

In 1947, he was hired by athletic director Robert Neyland to take over head basketball coaching duties at the University of Tennessee in Knoxville, Tennessee, a position he held until 1959.

Head coaching record

Football

Basketball

References

External links
 Indiana Basketball Hall of Fame profile
 

1911 births
1975 deaths
All-American college men's basketball players
American football ends
American men's basketball coaches
American men's basketball players
Basketball coaches from Indiana
Basketball players from Indianapolis
Deaths from cancer in North Carolina
College men's basketball head coaches in the United States
Minnesota State Mavericks football coaches
Players of American football from Indianapolis
Purdue Boilermakers football players
Purdue Boilermakers football coaches
Purdue Boilermakers men's basketball coaches
Purdue Boilermakers men's basketball players
Tennessee Volunteers basketball coaches
Wisconsin–River Falls Falcons football coaches
Wisconsin–River Falls Falcons men's basketball coaches
Guards (basketball)